The Dezadeash Range is a mountain range in southern Yukon, Canada, located east of Haines Junction and south of the Alaska Highway. Although it can be considered to lie within the northern Boundary Ranges of the Coast Mountains, the Canadian Government consider the Dezadeash Range as part of the Yukon Plateau.

See also
List of mountain ranges

References

Boundary Ranges
Mountain ranges of Yukon